John R. Conway was the 30th mayor of New Orleans (June 10, 1868 – April 4, 1870).

Background
John R. Conway was born in Alexandria, Virginia in 1825. In 1862, he moved to New Orleans and began work at a cotton commission house (which buys and sells cotton for a customer), but was soon fired due to the suspension of business in New Orleans by the occupying Union forces. However, in 1865, Conway, along with his brother, Colin, entered business again, now as a wholesale grocer and commission merchant.

Politics
For quite a while, Conway had been greatly interested in politics, and considered active participation as part of his patriotic duty. After the Civil War, when the Orleans Parish Democratic Committee was reformed, Conway was named chairman. Conway worked with the Democratic State Central Committee to return control of the city back to the people, after several years of military control. Also during Conway's time as mayor, the city of New Orleans received a statue of Benjamin Franklin from neoclassical sculptor Hiram Powers.

Personal life
On December 9, 1857 Conway married Elize G. Waggeman. The couple had two daughters.
John R. Conway participated in many organizations, including the American Legion of Honor, the Chess, Checkers and Whist Club, the Board of Trade, the Chamber of Commerce, and was an organizer of the Sons of the Revolution. On March 11, 1896, at age 70, Conway died in his home in New Orleans, and was buried in the Cypress Grove Cemetery.

References

Politicians from Alexandria, Virginia
Mayors of New Orleans
1825 births
1896 deaths
Louisiana Democrats
19th-century American politicians